The Laurence Olivier Award for Best Newcomer in a Play was an annual award presented by the Society of London Theatre in recognition of achievements in commercial London theatre. The awards were established as the Society of West End Theatre Awards in 1976, and renamed in 1984 in honour of English actor and director Laurence Olivier.

This commingled award, covering all roles and responsibilities in a production, was introduced in 1980, and was last presented at the 2008 ceremony, after which it was retired. During its existence, the award was not used for 1991–2003, nor 2005–2007.

On the 12 occasions that this award was given, it was presented eight times to a performer (actor/actress), twice to a director, once to a writer and once to an entire theatre company. The company, and one of the two directors, were honoured based on a collection of works during their award-winning year.

Winners and nominees

1980s

2000s

See also
 Drama Desk Award for Outstanding Actor in a Play
 Tony Award for Best Actor in a Play

References

External links
 

Laurence Olivier Awards